Stanley Meakin (1860 – unknown) was an English footballer who played for Stoke.

Career
Meakin was born in Stoke-upon-Trent and played football with Tunstall before joining Stoke in 1887. He played once in FA Cup in the 1887–88 season which came in a 1–0 victory over local rivals Burslem Port Vale. He left Stoke at the end of the season and later played for Burslem Swifts.

Career statistics

References

English footballers
Stoke City F.C. players
1860 births
Year of death missing
Association football midfielders